Kees Zwamborn (born 28 March 1952) is a Dutch former professional footballer who played as a defender.

Zwamborn was born in Alblasserdam, South Holland. From 1978 to 1985, he played both in the Eredivisie and Eerste divisie as well as in the Bundesliga and NAC Breda. After his playing career he was employed in managing roles by Feyenoord Rotterdam, FC Den Bosch, NAC Breda, Willem II Tilburg, an academy director at Sunderland A.F.C. between 2003 and 2004 and Ajax. In 2010, he became the manager of the Suriname national team.

References

1952 births
Living people
People from Alblasserdam
Dutch footballers
Footballers from South Holland
Association football defenders
Fortuna Vlaardingen players
MSV Duisburg players
AFC Ajax players
NAC Breda players
Dutch football managers
FC Den Bosch managers
NAC Breda managers
Willem II (football club) managers
Suriname national football team managers
Sunderland A.F.C. non-playing staff
Expatriate footballers in Germany
Expatriate football managers in Suriname
Dutch expatriate football managers